Nicolas Hénard (born 16 September 1964) is a French sailor. He is a double Olympic gold medal winner.  First in the 1988 Summer Olympics in Seoul, South Korea, winning the Tornado Class with Jean-Yves Le Déroff. Second in the 1992 Summer Olympics in Barcelona, winning the Tornado Class with Yves Loday.

References

External links
 

1964 births
Living people
French male sailors (sport)
Sailors at the 1988 Summer Olympics – Tornado
Sailors at the 1992 Summer Olympics – Tornado
Olympic sailors of France
Olympic gold medalists for France
Olympic medalists in sailing
Medalists at the 1992 Summer Olympics
Medalists at the 1988 Summer Olympics